"If I Could Reach You" is a song written by Randall Clayton McNeill and recorded by the 5th Dimension in 1972.

Chart performance
The song was the group's final top 10 on the Hot 100, peaking at number 10 there, and was the group's final number one on the Easy Listening chart, on 28 October 1972.

See also
List of number-one adult contemporary singles of 1972 (U.S.)

References

1972 singles
1972 songs
The 5th Dimension songs
Johnny Mathis songs
Bell Records singles
Song recordings produced by Bones Howe